Henry Mouzon II was a colonial-era patriot and renowned civil engineer. He prepared the definitive survey of the North and South Carolina Colonies prior to the start of the American Revolutionary War. He served as an officer of the Continental Line and as a militia officer in Francis Marion’s Brigade, where he distinguished himself in the Battle of Black Mingo.

Early life
Mouzon’ s family was of French Huguenot ancestry. His parents were William Henry Mouzon, I (born 1713) and Anne Videau. The family immigrated to Mouzon, South Carolina which is located in present-day Williamsburg County. Their son William Henry II was born on May 18, 1741, at the Mouzon Plantation. William Henry II spoke fluent French. Following his father's death in 1749, eight-year-old Henry II was sent to France to further his education.

The Mouzon Map
Mouzon subsequently graduated from the Sorbonne as a civil engineer and surveyor of the first rank. He received his first important public commission in 1771, when he and Ephraim Mitchell were appointed by Governor Lord Charles Grevill Montague to survey the boundaries of the civil districts of South Carolina. In May 1774, Mouzon advertised a proposal for a new map of South Carolina with corrections to the two extant maps of the Colony (James Cook's 1771 A Map of South Carolina with all the islands, marshes... and Cook's 1773 A Map of the Province of South Carolina, with all the rivers...). When Mouzon's map was published in May 1775 by Sayer and Bennett, it also included North Carolina, likely a decision by the publishers in anticipation of their 1776 American Atlas.

Mouzon's map became an important military asset for those fighting in the Southern theater of operations during the American Revolutionary War. The copy of the Mouzon map carried by George Washington is preserved at the American Geographical Society Library in Milwaukee, Wisconsin. The copy of the Mouzon map carried by Sir Henry Clinton, the British Commander, is preserved at the William L. Clements Library at the University of Michigan in Ann Arbor. The Mouzon map remained the chief map of the region until the 1808 map of North Carolina by Price & Strother, and the 1822 map of South Carolina by John Wilson.

Santee Canal
The South Carolina Commons House of Assembly proposed a survey in 1770 to determine the most favorable routes for a canal to connect the Santee River with the Cooper River which would provide a direct outlet to Charleston Harbor. To this end, Henry Mouzon Jr. was commissioned in 1773 to survey routes for such an inland waterway. His five suggested routes were later abandoned Colonel Johann Christian Senf, However, Mouzon played a seminal role in the creation of America's first true canal system.

Family life
Mouzon married Susannah Taylor on January 10, 1769, at Black Mingo, South Carolina. Henry and Susannah were the parents of 10 children: Ann, Peter, William Henry III, Samuel Ruffin, Susannah Videau, Sarah Elizabeth, Mary Bonneau, Henry Videau, Edward, and James.

Service in the Revolutionary War
Mouzon's life is closely connected to that of his first cousin and closest friend, General Francis Marion, the "Swamp Fox." Francis and Mouzon served together as lieutenants under Colonels Montgomery and Grant in the colonial campaigns against the Cherokee Indians. Mouzon was commissioned by the Continental Congress as a lieutenant in the Continental Army in 1777. He served in the Third South Carolina Regiment until the fall of Charleston, South Carolina to the British on May 12, 1780. Soon after the fall of Charleston, the British sent three armies from the city to establish garrisons of soldiers in every thickly-settled community in the province. In support of this effort, the Legion of Lieutenant Colonial Banastre Tarleton was sent from Georgetown, South Carolina to Camden, South Carolina by way of Kingstree. Tarleton burned Mouzon's plantation, reportedly because Mouzon was a French Huguenot; this marked the only action of Tarleton's in this campaign that Cornwallis approved.

Following the destruction of the Mouzon Plantation on August 7, 1780, the citizens of Williamsburg sent Major James to Georgetown, South Carolina to inquire of the British Commander, Naval Captain Ardesoif, of the conditions of their parole. James was informed by Ardesoif that the paroled officers of Williamsburg would be expected to take up arms against their countrymen. James left the meeting in a great state of agitation and returned to Williamsburg, where a battalion was organized under Captain Mouzon and several others.  Mouzon and two other men left to find Colonel Francis Marion and bring him to Williamsburg to command the battalion.  On September 14, 1780, Marion's forces attacked those of Colonel Cumming Ball at the Battle of Black Mingo Creek.  Mouzon was severely injured in this battle; his injuries would affect him for the rest of his life.

See also
Battle of Black Mingo
Francis Marion

References

Porcher, F. P. & Salley, A. S. The History of the Santee Canal. (1903) 16pp. Available at Old Santee Canal Park Gift Shop.

External links
The two Henry Mouzon Jrs merged in this article
"An Accurate Map of North and South Carolina With Their Indian Frontiers." High resolution image of Henry Mouzon's 1775 map of North and South Carolina.
 SCETV Guides-Santee Canal

1741 births
1807 deaths
Continental Army officers from South Carolina
South Carolina colonial people
South Carolina militiamen in the American Revolution
Huguenot participants in the American Revolution